Pakri may refer to:

 Pakri Peninsula, vicinity of Paldiski, Estonia
 Pakri Islands, adjacent to the peninsula
 Pakri, Ghazipur, India
 Pakri Barawan, a sub-divisional town in Nawada district of Indian State of Bihar
 Pakri, Bihar, a village in the west Champaran district in the Indian state of Bihar
 Pakri pakohi, a village in Muzaffarpur district of Bihar, India